Souten: The Other Woman is a 2006 Bollywood film written and directed by Karan Razdan, starring Gulshan Grover, Mahima Chaudhry, Vikram Singh, Kiran Rathod and Shakti Kapoor. The film was released on 24 March 2006.

Cast 
 Mahima Chaudhry as Mitali 'Mita' Singh
 Gulshan Grover as Ranbir Singh
 Kiran Rathod as Sapna Singh
 Vikram Singh as Rajvir Singh (Raj)
 Padmini Kohlapure as Smita Singh
 Shakti Kapoor as Sumer Singh
 Shiva Rindani as Sardar Singh

Soundtrack 
All songs composed by Anand–Milind with lyrics written by Praveen Bhardwaj.

 "Barsaat Hai" - Alka Yagnik, Udit Narayan
 "Kuch Dard" - Sunidhi Chauhan
 "Kuch Dard" (duet) - Sunidhi Chauhan, Abhijeet Bhattacharya
 "Mohabbat Ho Gayee" - Alka Yagnik, Sonu Nigam
 "Souten Souten" - Richa Sharma, Sunidhi Chauhan
 "Souten Souten" (version 2) - Richa Sharma, Sunidhi Chauhan

See also 
 Bollywood films of 2006

References

Further reading

External links 
 

2006 films
2000s Hindi-language films
Films scored by Anand–Milind
Films directed by Karan Razdan